XO, formerly XOJET,  is an on demand private jet company based in Fort Lauderdale, Florida.

XO offers clients private charters and the ability to purchase individual seats on shared flights, as well as a fixed-price membership program that are  alternatives to jet cards and fractional ownership of aircraft., in the same market as competitors NetJets and Flexjet.

History
XOJET was founded in 2006 by Paul Touw and Keith Krach as a private jet charter company with customers purchasing a set number of flight hours to use per year, similar to fractional ownership.

TPG Capital acquired XOJet in 2009.

In July 2017, XOJET launched Select Access, a new $50,000 level. It also added Light and Mid-Size type jets to its Elite Access program and instituted membership and monthly fees. 

In August of 2017, XOJET had more than 7,000 clients worldwide.

In June 2019, Vista Global merged XOJET with JetSmarter rebranding the combined entity as XO.

Investors
XOJET is owned and controlled by TPG Capital and Mubadala, two of the world's largest private capital investors.

In February 2017, XOJET said it had retained Perella Weinberg Partners to explore financial options, including a possible sale or merger. 

On September 20, 2018, Vista Global, the parent company of VistaJet said it had reached an agreement to acquire the fleet and commercial operations of XOJET. In July 2021 Vista Global announced an 82% year-on-year increase in XO deposit members.

Fleet

XOJET owns and operates Bombardier Challenger 300 and Cessna Citation X jets.

Through a preferred operator partnership program, XOJET has access to 1,450+ private aircraft; available types include the Hawker 400XP, Hawker 800XP and Gulfstream V.

Services
The company offers a number of private jet charter programs that allow customers to choose their arrival and departure points.

References

Fractional aircraft ownership companies
Airlines based in Florida
Charter airlines of the United States
Airlines established in 2006